Ralph Burton was a British soldier and MP, and Canadian settler.

Ralph Burton may also refer to:

Ralph Burton (Leicester MP) (fl. 1322–1340)
Ralph Wallace Burton, artist
Ralph Burton, character in The World, the Flesh and the Devil (1959 film)